The Northeast Correctional Complex is a state prison located in the community Doe Valley, few miles outside the town of Mountain City, Johnson County, Tennessee, owned and operated by the Tennessee Department of Correction.  The facility holds 1819 male inmates and opened in 1991.

References 

Prisons in Tennessee
Johnson County, Tennessee
1991 establishments in Tennessee